The following were the scheduled events of sailing for the year 2017 throughout the world.

Events

Olympic classes events

World championships
19–26 August: Women's Laser Radial World Championship in Medemblik, Netherlands
 : 	
 : 	
 : 
7–15 July: 470 World Championships in Thessaloniki, Greece
Men's 470
 : 
 : 
 : 
Women's 470
 : 
 : 
 : 
28 August – 2 September: 49er & 49er FX World Championships in Porto, Portugal
Men's 49er
 : 
 : 
 : 
Women's 49er FX
 : 
 : 
 : 
1–10 September: Finn Gold Cup in Balatonföldvár, Hungary
 : 
 : 
 : 
5–10 September: Nacra 17 World Championship in La Grande-Motte, France
 : 
 : 
 : 
12–19 September: Laser World Championship in Split, Croatia
 : 	
 : 	
 : 
16–23 September: 2017 RS:X World Championships in Enoshima, Japan
Men's RS:X
 : 	
 : 	 
 : 
Women's RS:X
 : 			
 : 	 	 	 
 :

Sailing World Cup
22 January – 11 June: 2017 Sailing World Cup
22–29 January: Sailing World Cup Miami in Miami, United States
Men's 470 winners: 
Women's 470 winners: 
Men's 49er winners: 
Women's 49er FX winners: 
Men's Laser winner: 
Women's Laser Radial winner: 
Mixed Nacra 17 winners: 
Men's RS:X winner: 
Women's RS:X winner: 
23–30 April: Sailing World Cup Hyères in Hyères, France
2.4 Metre winner: 
Men's 470 winners: 
Women's 470 winners: 
Men's 49er winners: 
Women's 49er FX winners: 
Men's Finn winner: 
Men's Formula Kite winner: 
Men's Laser winner: 
Women's Laser Radial winner: 
Mixed Nacra 17 winners: 
Men's RS:X winner: 
Women's RS:X winner: 
4–11 June: Sailing World Cup Final in Santander, Spain
Men's 470 winners: 
Women's 470 winners: 
Men's 49er winners: 
Women's 49er FX winners: 
Men's Finn winner: 
Men's Formula Kite winner: 
Men's Laser winner: 
Women's Laser Radial winner: 
Mixed Nacra 17 winners: 
Men's RS:X winner: 
Women's RS:X winner: 
15 October 2017 – 10 June 2018: 2018 Sailing World Cup
15–22 October: Sailing World Cup Gamagōri in Gamagori, Japan
Men's 470 winners: 
Women's 470 winners: 
Men's 49er winners: 
Women's 49er FX winners: 
Men's Laser winner: 
Women's Laser Radial winner: 
Men's RS:X winner: 
Women's RS:X winner:

African championships
27 November – 2 December: RS:X African Championships in Moonbeach Resort, Egypt
 : 
 : 
 :

Asian championships
14–21 November: RS:X Asian Championships in Penghu, Taiwan
Men's RS:X
 : 
 : 
 : 
Women's RS:X
 : 
 : 
 : 
28–29 October: Nacra 17 Asian Championship in Shanghai, China
 : 
 : 
 :

European championships
5–13 May: Finn European Championship in Marseille, France
 : 
 : 
 : 
8–13 May: RS:X European Championships in Marseille, France
Men's RS:X
 : 
 : 
 : 
Women's RS:X
 : 
 : 
 : 
8–13 May: 470 European Championships in Monaco, Monaco
Men's 470
 : 
 : 
 : 
Women's 470
 : 
 : 
 : 
30 July – 4 August: 49er & 49er FX European Championships & Nacra 17 European Championship in Kiel, Germany
Men's 49er
 : 
 : 
 : 
Women's 49er FX
 : 
 : 
 : 
Mixed Nacra 17
 : 
 : 
 : 
1–8 October: Laser European Championships in Barcelona, Spain
Men's Laser
 : 
 : 
 : 
Women's Laser Radial
 : 
 : 
 :

North American championships
14–16 January: 470 North American Championships in Coconut Grove, United States
 : 
 : 
 : 
19–20 January: RS:X North American Championships in Miami, United States
Men's RS:X
 : 
 : 
 : 
Women's RS:X
 : 
 : 
 : 
21–25 June: Laser North American Championship in Vancouver, Canada
Men's Laser
 : 
 : 
 : 
Open Laser Radial
 : 
 : 
 : 
22–25 June: 49er & 49er FX North American Championships in Kingston, Canada
Men's 49er
 : 
 : 
 : 
Women's 49er FX
 : 
 : 
 :

South American championships
2–5 March: 470 South American Championships in Porto Alegre, Brazil
 : 
 : 
 : 
13–17 November: RS:X South American Championships in Buenos Aires, Argentina
Men's RS:X
 : 
 : 
 : 
Women's & Youth RS:X
 : 
 : 
 :

Other major events

America's Cup
26 May – 12 June: 2017 Louis Vuitton Cup in Great Sound, Hamilton, Bermuda
 Winners:  Emirates Team New Zealand
 17–27 June: 2017 America's Cup in Great Sound, Hamilton, Bermuda
  Emirates Team New Zealand defeated  Oracle Team USA, 7–1.
 20 & 21 June: 2017 Youth America's Cup in Great Sound, Hamilton, Bermuda
 Winners:  Land Rover BAR Academy (50 points); Second:  NZL Sailing Team (48 points); Third:  Team Tilt (42 points)

Extreme Sailing Series
8 March – 3 December: 2017 Extreme Sailing Series
 8–11 March: Act #1 in Muscat, Oman
 Winners:  SAP Extreme Sailing Team
 28 April – 1 May: Act #2 in Qingdao, China
 Winners:  Alinghi
 29 June – 2 July: Act #3 in Madeira, Portugal
 Winners:  SAP Extreme Sailing Team
 20–23 July: Act #4 in Barcelona, Spain
 Winners:  Oman Air
 10–13 August: Act #5 in Hamburg, Germany
 Winners:  Oman Air
 25–28 August: Act #6 in Cardiff, United Kingdom
 Winners:  SAP Extreme Sailing Team
 19–22 October: Act #7 in San Diego, United States
 Winners:  SAP Extreme Sailing Team
 30 November – 3 December: Act #8 in Los Cabos, Mexico
 Winners:  Alinghi

Global Kite Sports Association

PWA World Tour
 3–8 May: Korea
 11–16 May: Fly! ANA Windsurfing World Cup in Yokosuka, Japan
 23–28 May: Catalunya, Costa Brava PWA World Cup + Foil Race in Costa Brava, Spain
 9–15 July: Gran Canaria, Spain
 21–30 July: Fuerteventura, Spain
 6–12 August: Tenerife, Spain
 9–14 September: Waterz Festival in Hvide Sande, Denmark
 29 September – 8 October: Mercedes-Benz World Cup in Sylt, Germany
 21–26 November: Noumea Dream Cup

Volvo Ocean Race
14 October 2017 – 30 June 2018: 2017–18 Volvo Ocean Race
14 October: In-Port Race in Alicante, Spain
22–28 October: Leg #1 from Alicante, Spain to Lisbon, Portugal
3 November: In-Port Race in Lisbon, Portugal
5–24 November: Leg #2 from Lisbon, Spain to Cape Town, South Africa
8 December: In-Port Race in Cape Town, South Africa
10–27 December: Leg #3 from Cape Town, South Africa to Melbourne, Australia

Women's International Match Racing Series
16 June – 16 December: 2017 Women's International Match Racing Series
16–21 June: Women’s Match Racing World Championship in Helsinki, Finland
 : 
 : 
 : 
7–12 August: Lysekil Women's Match in Lysekil, Sweden
  defeated , 3–1 in the final.
13–18 November: Busan Cup Women's International Match Race in Busan, South Korea
  defeated , 3–0 in the final.
30 November – 3 December: Carlos Aguilar Match Race in Saint Thomas, US Virgin Islands (cancelled)
11–16 December: International Bedanne's Cup in Tourville-la-Rivière, France
  defeated , 3–1 in the final.

World Match Racing Tour
20 March – 8 October: 2017 World Match Racing Tour
20–25 March: Match Cup Australia in Perth, Australia
  defeated , 3–0 in the final.
29 March – 2 April: Congressional Cup in Long Beach, United States
  defeated , 3–2 in the final.
2–9 July: GKSS Match Cup in Marstrand, Sweden
  defeated , 3–0 in the final.
1–6 August: Match Cup Russia in Saint Petersburg, Russia
  defeated , 3–0 in the final.
5–10 September: Chicago Match Cup in Chicago, United States
  defeated , 3–0 in the final.
3-8 October: Match Cup China in Xiamen, China
  defeated , 3–1 in the final.

Other classes

World championships
17–22 April: IFCA Youth & Masters Slalom World Championships in Almanarre, France
17–22 April: IFCA World Championships (Slalom Junior, Youth & Masters) in Hyères, France
9–17 June: Dragon World Championship in Cascais, Portugal
 : 
 : 
 : 
10–15 June: RS:One World Championships in Hoi Han, Vietnam
20–25 June: Para World Sailing Championships in Kiel, Germany
2.4 Metre:
 : 
 : 
 : 
Men's Hansa 303:
 : 
 : 
 : 
Women's Hansa 303:
 : 
 : 
 : 
24 June – 1 July: RS:X World Youth Championships in Torbole, Italy
29 June – 7 July: Star World Championship in Troense, Denmark
 : 
 : 
 : 
10–14 July: J/80 World Championship in Hamble-le-Rice, United Kingdom	
11–21 July: Optimist World Championship in Pattaya, Thailand
 : 
 : 
 : 
13-16 July: M32 World Championship in Marstrand, Sweden
 : 
 : 
 : 
15–21 July: Contender World Championship in Sønderborg, Denmark
 : 
 : 
 : 
16–24 July: Laser 4.7 World Youth Championship in Nieuwpoort, Belgium
Boys' Laser 4.7
 : 
 : 
 : 
Girls' Laser 4.7
 : 
 : 
 : 
19–23 July: Hobie 14 World Championships in Noordwijk, Netherlands
21–30 July: Moth World Championship in Malcesine, Italy
 : 
 : 
 : 
23–28 July: Topper World Championships in Loctudy, France
26–29 July: Hobie Wild Cat World Championships in Noordwijk, Netherlands
26 July – 2 August: Laser World Under-21 Championships in Nieuwpoort, Belgium
Men's Laser
 : 
 : 
 : 
Women's Laser Radial
 : 
 : 
 : 
29 July – 5 August: 29er World Championship in Long Beach, United States
 : 
 : 
 : 
31 July – 5 August: Open Bic World Championships in Arco, Italy
11–17 August: Laser Radial World Youth Championships in Medemblik, Netherlands
Boys' Laser Radial
 : 
 : 	
 : 
Girls' Laser Radial
 : 
 : 
 : 
19–26 August: Men's Laser Radial World Championship in Medemblik,
Netherlands
 : 
 : 
 : 
20–25 August: H-Boat World Championship in Brunnen, Switzerland
 : 
 : 
 : 
20–27 August: Finn Silver Cup in Balatonfüred, Hungary
 : 
 : 
 : 
23–26 August: 420 World Team Racing Championships in Campione del Garda, Italy
29 August – 3 September:  in Boryeong, South Korea
12–16 September: J/70 World Championship in Porto Cervo, Italy
 : 
 : 
 : 
15–21 September: 6 Metre World Cup in Vancouver, Canada
 : 
 : 
 : 
20–29 September: 505 World Championship in Annapolis, United States
 : 
 : 
 : 
21–30 September: Laser World Masters Championships in Split, Croatia
25–30 September: Flying Dutchman World Championship in Scarlino, Italy
 : 
 : 
 : 
4–8 October: IKA KiteFoil World Championships in Cagliari, Italy
4–9 September: 5.5 Metre World Championship in Benodet, France
 : 
 : 
 : 
14–20 October: Kiteboarding World Championships in Porto Pollo, Italy	
13–17 November: KiteFoil GoldCup Final (World Championships) in The Pearl, Qatar
18–24 November: Formula Kite World Championships in Muscat, Oman
11–15 December: Youth Sailing World Championships in Sanya, China
Boys' 29er winners: 
Girls' 29er winners: 
Boys' 420 winners: 
Girls' 420 winners: 
Boys' Laser Radial winner: 
Girls' Laser Radial winner: 
Mixed Nacra 15 winners: 
Boys' RS:X winner: 
Girls' RS:X winner: 
Nation's Trophy winners:

European championships
15–19 April: Laser 4.7 European Championship in Murcia, Spain
6–13 May: RS:X European Youth Championships in Marseille, France
28 May – 2 June: International 14 European Championship in Riva del Garda, Italy
3–5 June: RS Feva European Championship in Versoix, Switzerland
28 June −2 July: European Match Racing Championship in Ledro, Italy
29 June – 2 July: 11:Metre One Design European Championship in Flensburg, Germany
4–9 July: IFCA Men slalom european championship in La Tranche-sur-Mer, France
5–9 July: 505 European Championship in Warnemünde, Germany
11–16 July:  in Gizzeria Lido, Italy
13–17 July: Soling European Championship in Riva del Garda, Italy
 : 
 : 
 : 
16–21 July: F16 European Championship in Morges, Switzerland
18–22 July: Para Sailing European Championship in Gdynia, Poland
22–30 July: 420 European Championships in Athens, Greece
24–28 July: RS100 European Championship in Alto Lario, Italy
25–29 July: OK European Championship in Faaborg, Denmark
 : 
 : 
 : 
6–13 August: 420 European Junior Championships & 470 European Junior Championships in Riva del Garda, Italy
12–17 August: Formula Kite European Championships in Tirmata, Turkey
14–19 August: Dragon European Championship in Thun, Switzerland
 : 
 : 
 : 
14–17 September: Sunfish European Championship in Punta Ala, Italy
1–8 October: Laser European Championships in Barcelona, Spain
Men's Laser Radial
 : 
 : 
 : 
21–27 October: Hansa European Championships in Étang de Thau, France
24–29 October: Star European Championship in Sanremo, Italy
 : 
 : 
 :

North American championships
13–17 August: 29er North American Championship in Kingston, Canada
24–27 August: Soling North American Championship in Milwaukee, United States
 : 
 : 
 : 
5–10 September: Star North American Championship in Marblehead, United States
 : 
 : 
 :

South American championships
23–27 November: Star South American Championship in Olivos, Argentina
 : 
 : 
 :

Other events
6–11 March: Bacardi Cup in Miami, United States
 Winners: 
24 March – 1 April: Trofeo Princesa Sofia in Palma, Spain
Men's 470 winners: 
Women's 470 winners: 
Men's 49er winners: 
Women's 49er FX winners: 
Men's Finn winner: 
Men's Laser winner: 
Women's Laser Radial winner: 
Mixed Nacra 17 winners: 
Men's RS:X winner: 
Women's RS:X winner: 
Dragon winners: 
J/80 winners: 
23–27 May: Delta Lloyd Regatta in Medemblik, Netherlands
Men's Laser winner: 
Women's Laser Radial winner: 
Men's & Women's 470 winners: 
Men's 49er winners: 
Women's 49er FX winners: 
Men's RS:X winner: 
2.4 Metre winner: 
17–25 June: Kiel Week in Kiel, Germany
Men's 470 winners: 
Women's 470 winners: 
Men's 49er winners: 
Women's 49er FX winners: 
Men's Finn winner: 
Men's Laser winner: 
Women's Laser Radial winner: 
Mixed Nacra 17 winners: 
12 Metre winners:  
2.4 Metre winner: 
29er winners: 
420 winners: 
5.5 Metre winners: 
505 winners: 
Albin Express winners: 
Contender winner: 
Europe winner: 
Flying Dutchman winners: 
Formula 18 winners: 
Hobie 16 winners: 
J/24 winners: 
J/70 winners: 
J/80 winners: 
Laser 4.7 winner: 
Open Laser Radial winner: 
Melges 24 winners: 
Nordic Folkboat winners: 
OK winner: 
5–9 December: Star Sailors League Finals in Nassau, Bahamas
 Winners: 
26 December 2017 – 1 January 2018: 2017 Sydney to Hobart Yacht Race from Sydney, Australia to Hobart, Australia
 Line honours: , 1d 9h 15m 24s
 Handicap winners: , 2d 12h 13m 31s

References

 
Sailing by year

tt:R World Championships
tt:R European Championships